Vujica Vulićević also known as Vule Vulićević (1773–1828) was a Serbian voivode (military commander) in the First Serbian Uprising of the Serbian Revolution, led by Grand Leader Karađorđe against the Ottoman Empire. He held the rank of Obor-knez. He was also the kum (godfather) of Karađorđe, but betrayed him on behalf of Miloš Obrenović, the rival prince.

Life

Personal
Vujica was born in the village of Azanja, in Smederevska Palanka, then part of the Sanjak of Smederevo, an Ottoman province covering central Serbia. His eldest brother was voivode Đuša Vulićević, the district holder of Smederevo. His son, Petar, was married to the sister of Ljubica Vukomanović, the wife of Miloš Obrenović.

Revolution
He was part of the First Serbian Uprising since the start.  Among his subordinates, was Djordje Zagla.

In December 1806, voivodes Vujica, Mladen Milovanović and Stanoje Glavas commanded an army of 18,000 soldiers to defend at the Battle of Deligrad. The fight ended in Serbian victory, with Ibrahim Bushati, pasha of Shkodër, signing a 6-week truce.

Together with voivode Čolak-Anta Simeonović, he led Karađorđe's offensive from Nikšić to Montenegro in May 1809.

After the murder of his brother Đuša, Vujica becomes Obor-knez, or holder of the Smederevo district.

He was sent by Miloš with Prota Mateja to negotiate with Marashli Pasha in Ćuprija.

The murder of Karađorđe

In 1812, threatened by Napoleon's French Empire, Russia had to quickly sign a peace treaty with the Ottomans. In 1813, the Ottoman Empire launched a big assault on Serbia taking land all up to the rivers Morava and the river Drina, and Karađorđe, along with other rebel leaders, fled to the Austrian Empire on 21 September 1813.  After some time, Karađorđe emigrated to Bessarabia, where he joined the Greek national liberation movement Filiki Eteria, where he became an active member. The Greeks were primarily interested in using the Serbian lands as base of the Greek operations. Miloš Obrenović was fully uncooperative.

On 25 July 1817, in the Radovanjski Lug forest, within reach of Velika Plana, Miloš Obrenović had Karađorđe killed, and although Vujica was his godfather, he helped in the arrangement and betrayed his godson.  There also exist stories that Vujica himself killed Karađorđe, when he slept in his cabin, as a guest.  Miloš had his head sent to the Sultan.  In a sign of regret, he founded the Pokajnica Monastery (Repentance) wooden-church in 1818.

Later years
In 1821, he is appointed diplomat and sent to Constantinople (now Istanbul). In 1827, he returns to Serbia. He was given an Ottoman Kilij for his service.

See also
 List of Serbian Revolutionaries

References

Sources
 Matica Srpska, Biografija
 Stojan V. Živadinović, Vujica Vulićević, 1933
 Nebojša Damnjanović, Vladimir Merenik, The first Serbian uprising and the restoration of the Serbian state, Historical Museum of Serbia, Gallery of the Serbian Academy of Science and Arts, 2004

1773 births
1828 deaths
People from Smederevska Palanka
People of the First Serbian Uprising
Serbian revolutionaries
18th-century Serbian nobility
19th-century Serbian nobility
Burials at Serbian Orthodox monasteries and churches